Consolidation may refer to:

In science and technology
 Consolidation (computing), the act of linkage editing in computing
 Memory consolidation, the process in the brain by which recent memories are crystallised into long-term memory
 Pulmonary consolidation, a clinical term for solidification into a firm dense mass
 Consolidation (soil), a geological process whereby a soil decreases in volume
 Consolidation, a popular name of a steam locomotive type, with 2-8-0 wheel, built first in 1864
 Semiconductor consolidation
 Ultrasonic consolidation

In economics
 Consolidation (business), the mergers or acquisitions of many smaller companies into much larger ones
 Consolidation (media), consolidation of United States media into a few companies
 Debt consolidation, the process of combining two or more loans into one big loan
 Federal student loan consolidation, allows students to consolidate student loans into one single debt
 Consolidated financial statement

Other uses
 Championship consolidation, the act of combining two separate championships into a single title
 Democratic consolidation, the process by which a new democracy matures
 Federal student loan consolidation
 Joinder, the consolidation of multiple legal cases
 Land consolidation, the process that consolidates small fragmented parcels of land into larger contiguous plots
 Municipal consolidation, the act of merging two or more municipalities to form a single new one
 Urban consolidation

See also
 Consolidation bill
 Consolidation ratio
 Consolidated city–county, a consolidation of city and county governments used by some United States cities
 Consolidator (disambiguation)
 Likud, a conservative Israeli political party whose name is Hebrew for "Consolidation"